Company G, 1st U.S. Sharpshooters was an infantry company that served in the Union Army during the American Civil War. The unit is sometimes unofficially referred to as the 1st Wisconsin Sharpshooters.

Organization 
At the onset of the war, the United States Department of War charged Colonel Hiram Berdan, a known marksman, with the organization of two regiments of true marksmen, with the volunteers belonging to companies of their respective states. Company G was organized and recruited in Wisconsin under the supervision of Adjutant General William L. Utley, who was also a noted marksman and was crucial to the expedited process of organizing and mustering Wisconsin volunteer regiments. Berdan had the men issued green uniforms for a better blend into the wilderness, along with a distinction from the rest of the army wearing variations of blue. He also continuously petitioned the War Department for the issue of the Sharps Breechloading Rifle, versus the usual Springfield Rifle of Army issue. On September 19, 1861 the unit moved out from Camp Randall to rendezvous with the 1st United States Sharpshooters and were officially mustered into Federal service on September 23, 1861 in New York City. As this was an act of the War Department, the 1st and 2nd United States Sharpshooters were mustered into the regular Army and were not volunteer regiments.

Service 
At camp in Washington D.C., Company G along with the rest of the 1st U.S.S. practiced rigorous marksmanship drills; dignitaries and citizens alike could come watch the amazing feats the marksmen accomplished.

See also

 List of United States Volunteer Civil War units
 List of Wisconsin Civil War units
 Sharpshooter

Sources 
Quiner, E.B. Military History of Wisconsin. 1866. Clark & Co. Chicago,Il.  871-880. Print.
Wisconsin State Historical Society. www.wisconsinhistory.org

Military units and formations established in 1861
Military units and formations disestablished in 1864
Sharpshooter units and formations of the American Civil War
1861 establishments in the United States
Units and formations of the Union Army from Wisconsin
United States Volunteer Civil War units and formations